The Ministry of Government is a ministry of the Plurinational States of Bolivia. It is tasked with regulating public policy. The current Minister of Government is Eduardo del Castillo since 9 November 2020.

List of ministers

Notes

External links 

 Ministry of Government

References

Bibliography 
 

Government ministries of Bolivia
Internal affairs ministries
1826 establishments in Bolivia